Alkalihalobacillus alkalisediminis is a Gram-positive, alkaliphilic and non-motile bacterium from the genus of Alkalihalobacillus.

References

Bacillaceae
Bacteria described in 2011